Seed to Sun is the first solo studio album by Boom Bip. It was released through Lex Records on September 16, 2002. "Mannequin Hand Trapdoor I Reminder" was released as a single from the album.

Critical reception

John Bush of AllMusic gave the album 4.5 stars out of 5, saying, "It's experimental hip-hop being done on a level reached by few producers out there." Olli Siebelt of BBC called it "an album that is as experimental and cutting edge as anything in Warp's back catalogue." Sam Chennault of Pitchfork gave the album a 7.3 out of 10, commenting that "Seed to Sun works best when it's either quirkily repetitive or resigning itself to funky experimentation."

Track listing

Personnel
Credits adapted from liner notes.

 Boom Bip – music
 Buck65 – lyrics (4), vocals (4)
 Nacky Koma – lyrics (8), vocals (8)
 Dose One – lyrics (10), vocals (10)
 Ashley Shepherd – additional instrumentation (10)
 Ehquestionmark – artwork

References

External links
 

2002 debut albums
Boom Bip albums
Lex Records albums